John A. McDougall (born May 17, 1947) is an American physician and author. He has written a number of diet books advocating the consumption of a low-fat vegan diet based on starchy foods and vegetables.

His eponymous diet, called The McDougall Plan was a New York Times bestseller. It has been categorized as a low-fat fad diet. The diet rejects all animal products as well as cooking oils, processed food, alcoholic beverages and caffeinated drinks. As with any restrictive high-fiber diet, it may lead to flatulence, possibly poor mineral absorption from excess fiber, and limited food choices that may lead to a feeling of deprivation.

Life 
McDougall is a graduate of Michigan State University's College of Human Medicine. He performed his internship at Queen's Medical Center in Honolulu, Hawaii, in 1972 and his medical residency at the University of Hawaii. McDougall contributed to the Vegetarian Times magazine and has appeared on television talk shows.

McDougall is also a member of the advisory board of the Physicians Committee for Responsible Medicine (PCRM). In 2016, he was one of four named plaintiffs in a lawsuit by the PCRM alleging improper influence by the egg industry on establishing cholesterol recommendations in the US. The lawsuit was dismissed in 2016.

Medical practice

Diet programs and products 
In 2002, McDougall began the McDougall Program at the Flamingo Resort in Santa Rosa, California. The McDougall Program, based in Santa Rosa, is a 10-day residential treatment program which features a low-fat, starch-based, vegan diet. The McDougall diet is a low-fat starch-based diet that is high in fiber and contains no cholesterol. The diet is based on a variety of starches such as rice, potatoes, corn, breads, pasta, and fresh or frozen fruits and vegetables. For example, a meal might be made of a baked potato with steamed broccoli, or steamed brown rice with steamed vegetables, perhaps with a piece of fruit for dessert.

McDougall is the co-founder of the now Woodland-based Dr. McDougall's Right Foods Inc., which produces dried and packaged soups, manufactured for it by the SF Spice Co.

McDougall has promoted his diet as an alternative treatment for a number of chronic disorders, including arthritis, atherosclerosis, cancer, diabetes, hypertension and osteoporosis.

Reception 
His book The McDougall Plan was a New York Times bestseller.

McDougall has been criticized for making unsubstantiated health claims. Some of McDougall's dietary recommendations are in line with mainstream nutritional advice, such as an emphasis on fruits, vegetables and whole grains, but others are considered extreme and are not supported by evidence. McDougall's diet plan has been called a low-fat fad diet that may lead to flatulence, possibly poor mineral absorption from excess fiber and limited food choices that sometimes may lead to nutrient deprivation. The diet places patients at risk of being deprived of zinc, vitamin D, calcium, iron, omega-3 fatty acids, and vitamin B12 when followed strictly.

In 1992, nutritionist Kurt Butler described McDougall's ideas as "vegetarian extremism" and McDougall as "Americas most influential vegan zealot" who has taken the low-fat vegetarian diet to extremes.

Reviewing McDougall's book The McDougall Program for Maximum Weight Loss, nutritionist Fredrick J. Stare and epidemiologist Elizabeth Whelan criticized its restrictive regime and "poor advice", concluding that the diet's concepts were "extreme and out of keeping with nutritional reality". The authors state that failure to consume dairy products creates a risk for osteoporosis, and that if animal products cannot be replaced with peanut butter and soybean foods, vegans may not obtain enough protein. Reviewing The McDougall Program: 12 Days to Dynamic Health, doctor Harriet Hall wrote that the book is filled with anecdotes and questionable statements, and that it makes many claims which are not supported by science. Hall concluded that "Some of McDougall’s recommendations are in line with mainstream advice, but there is reason to fear that strict adherence to his whole Program might result in nutritional deficits that could do more harm than good."

McDougall's dieting advice has been studied for its efficacy in patients with relapsing remitting multiple sclerosis; a 2016 randomized controlled trial did not find significant evidence that the diet affects the severity or progression a patient's multiple sclerosis, but it did find that people on the diet showed lowered cholesterol, improved their insulin levels, experienced weight loss, and–due to the weight loss–experienced reductions in fatigue.

Bibliography
McDougall has written several books, with his wife Mary contributing recipes, that sold more than 1.5 million copies as of 2008.

References

Further reading

External links

1947 births
20th-century American physicians
21st-century American physicians
Alternative cancer treatment advocates
American cookbook writers
American health and wellness writers
American nutritionists
American veganism activists
High-fiber diet advocates
Living people
Michigan State University College of Human Medicine alumni
Plant-based diet advocates
Pseudoscientific diet advocates
University of Hawaiʻi alumni
Vegan cookbook writers
Writers from Detroit